Nicolás Gastón Navarro (born 25 March 1985) is an Argentine footballer, who played as a goalkeeper.

Club career
Navarro started his career with Argentinos Juniors in 2004. In 2007, he was sold to Italian Serie A side SSC Napoli for a fee of around 5 million US dollars, the biggest amount received by the Argentine club since Diego Maradona's transfer in 1981 (around 10 million of the same coin).

On 20 August 2009, Navarro joined River Plate on loan from Napoli. However, he played only 4 games in River. For the 2010–11 Argentine Primera División season, Navarro returned to Argentinos Juniors (defending champions of the Argentine league).

International career
Navarro was part of the Argentina Under-20 squad that won the 2005 FIFA World Youth Championship title. He also won a gold medal at the 2008 Summer Olympics. He was not part of the original squad, but received the call-up to replace injured goalkeeper Oscar Ustari during the tournament.

Honours

International
 Argentina Under-20
FIFA U-20 World Cup: 2005

 Argentina Olympic
Olympic Gold Medal: 2008

References

External links
 Player profile on Napoli's official website
 Argentine Primera statistics 
 
 

1985 births
Living people
Argentine footballers
Association football goalkeepers
Footballers from Buenos Aires
Argentine sportspeople of Italian descent
Argentina under-20 international footballers
Footballers at the 2008 Summer Olympics
Olympic footballers of Argentina
Olympic gold medalists for Argentina
Argentinos Juniors footballers
Club Atlético River Plate footballers
S.S.C. Napoli players
Kayserispor footballers
Club Atlético Tigre footballers
Club de Gimnasia y Esgrima La Plata footballers
San Lorenzo de Almagro footballers
Querétaro F.C. footballers
Arsenal de Sarandí footballers
Argentine Primera División players
Serie A players
Süper Lig players
Liga MX players
Argentine expatriate footballers
Expatriate footballers in Italy
Expatriate footballers in Turkey
Expatriate footballers in Mexico
Argentine expatriate sportspeople in Italy
Argentine expatriate sportspeople in Turkey
Argentine expatriate sportspeople in Mexico
Olympic medalists in football
Medalists at the 2008 Summer Olympics
Pan American Games medalists in football
Pan American Games gold medalists for Argentina
Footballers at the 2003 Pan American Games
Medalists at the 2003 Pan American Games